Goran Bošković (born 21 January 1972) is a Montenegrin professional basketball coach and former player, who last served as an assistant coach for Panathinaikos of the Greek Basket League and the EuroLeague.

Playing career 
Bošković started his career in his hometown. He also played for Radnički Beograd, FMP Železnik, Crvena zvezda, and Budućnost. He won the YUBA League championship in 1999 with Budućnost. Bošković played for an Israeli team Maccabi Rishon LeZion during the 2000–01 season.

In the French Pro A, Bošković played for SLUC Nancy, Limoges CSP, and Hyères-Toulon between 2001 and 2003. He won the FIBA Korać Cup title in 2002 with Nancy. Bošković also played for Atlas Belgrade during the 2003–04 season.

Coaching career

Women's basketball 
Bošković was the head coach for Budućnost Bemax between 2014 and 2019, winning two WABA Leagues.

Bošković coached Romaninan team CSM Satu Mare for one season, 2019–20.

National teams
In 2017, Bošković was an assistant coach for the Montenegro national team under Roberto Íñiguez. Between October 2017 and 2019, he was head coach of the Ukraine national team.

Men's basketball 
In December 2020, Bošković was named the first assistant coach for Crvena zvezda under Dejan Radonjić. He left the Zvezda after the Radonjić's departure in July 2022.

Career achievements and awards 
As player:
 FIBA Korać Cup winner: 1  (with SLUC Nancy: 2001–02)
 YUBA League champion: 1 (with Budućnost: 1998–99)
 Yugoslav Cup winner: 1 (with FMP Železnik: 1996–97)

As head coach:
 Montenegrin League champion: 5 (with Budućnost Bemax: 2014–15, 2015–16, 2016–17, 2017–18, 2018–19)
 WABA League champion: 2 (with Budućnost Bemax: 2015–16, 2017–18)
 Montenegrin Cup winner: 5 (with Budućnost Bemax: 2014–15, 2015–16, 2016–17, 2017–18, 2018–19)

As assistant coach:
 Adriatic League champion: 2 (with Crvena zvezda: 2020–21, 2021–22)
 Serbian League champion: 2  (with Crvena zvezda: 2020–21, 2021–22)
 Serbian Cup winner: 2  (with Crvena zvezda: 2020–21, 2021–22)

Individual
 Yugoslav Cup MVP – 1997
 2× WABA League Coach of the Year – 2016, 2018
 No. 10 retired by FMP

References

External links
 Player Statistics at fibaeurope.com
 Player Statistics at proballers.com
 Goran Boskovic at eurobasket.com

1972 births
Living people
BKK Radnički players
HTV Basket players
Keravnos B.C. players
KK Beopetrol/Atlas Beograd players
KK Budućnost players
KK Crvena zvezda assistant coaches
KK Crvena zvezda players
KK FMP (1991–2011) players
Limoges CSP players
Maccabi Rishon LeZion basketball players
Montenegrin basketball coaches
Montenegrin expatriate basketball people in France
Montenegrin expatriate basketball people in Greece
Montenegrin expatriate basketball people in Romania
Montenegrin expatriate basketball people in Serbia
Montenegrin men's basketball players
Panathinaikos B.C. coaches
Shooting guards
SLUC Nancy Basket players
Small forwards
Sportspeople from Podgorica